"Secret Invasion" is a comic book crossover storyline that ran through a self-titled eight-issue limited series and several tie-in books published by Marvel Comics from April through December 2008. The story involves a subversive, long-term invasion of Earth by the Skrulls, a group of alien shapeshifters who have secretly replaced many superheroes in the Marvel Universe with impostors over a period of years, prior to the overt invasion. Marvel's promotional tagline for the event was "Who do you trust?".

A six-episode television miniseries based on the storyline and produced by Marvel Studios as part of the Marvel Cinematic Universe (MCU) is scheduled to be released in 2023 on Disney+.

Production and marketing
Writer Brian Michael Bendis stated in interviews that the motivation for the invasion is the destruction of the Skrull Empire in the 2007 "Annihilation" storyline. Bendis said the Skrulls believe Earth "is religiously and rightfully theirs," and that there are hints as to the plot placed in the limited series Secret War and the title New Avengers from the first issue. The limited series concluded the plot and was, according to Bendis, "a hell of an end."

In November 2007, several ongoing titles and mini-series were branded as tie-ins to the main Secret Invasion storyline, with the tagline: Secret Invasion: The Infiltration. In addition to the core story, the Avengers titles provided additional plot material and acted as a link between titles. Other Marvel titles also featured variant covers with the characters depicted as Skrulls. Bendis stated that the series would not deal with the origins of the invasion, but is conceived from the following perspective: "If there's a character on the team who's a Skrull, we will rewind from when they got on that team, or from before they got on that team, so when they are infiltrated, how they became who they became and the effects of their actions from their 'point of view' is shown."

The Marvel website featured two online-exclusive e-comics for the event, titled Secret Invasion Prologue (a seven-page comic that reveals the replacement of a previously unknown Skrull agent) and Secret Invasion: Home Invasion (a MySpace video blog featuring a young teenager named Kinsey Walden and her fears regarding her brother's strange behavior), supported by comic pages by writer Ivan Brandon and artist Nick Postic.

Plot
After the Kree–Skrull War the Earth superheroes Iron Man, Mister Fantastic, Namor, Black Bolt, Professor Charles Xavier and Doctor Strange join as a group called the Illuminati to secretly confront the Skrulls. They attack the Skrull Empire, and warn that any future invasion attempts of Earth would mean further reprisals; however, they are all captured and intensely studied before escaping.

An eventual successor to the Skrull throne, Princess Veranke, claims that a prophecy foretold the annihilation of the Skrull homeworld. The current Emperor, Dorrek, exiles her to a prison world for inciting religious extremism. After the destruction of the Skrull Throneworld by the cosmic entity Galactus, Veranke becomes Empress by lineage, and guides an invasion of Earth, armed with the knowledge of superhumans gained from having studied the Illuminati. The Skrulls capture several superhumans and infiltrate Earth's defenses, with Veranke herself posing as heroine Spider-Woman. Veranke is inconvenienced when there is a breakout of supervillains at the Raft prison, which forces her to join the New Avengers team.

After the Civil War, Elektra, the leader of the ninja group the Hand, is revealed to be a Skrull named Pagon after dying in battle with the New Avengers. Veranke takes the corpse to Tony Stark (who, at the time, led the pro-registration Mighty Avengers) to sow distrust among the superhero community. She joins the Mighty Avengers, claiming it will throw the Skrulls off balance. Posing as agents of spy organization S.H.I.E.L.D., the Skrulls attempt to mine the metal vibranium in the Savage Land and battle the New Avengers before being killed. The Illuminati battle an impostor posing as Black Bolt and two new Super-Skrulls, possessing all-new powers.

The Skrull invasion destabilizes the superhuman community as: 
 Simultaneous strikes disable the S.H.I.E.L.D. Helicarrier and orbiting base The Peak.
 A breakout is instigated at the supervillain holding facility the Raft.
 The Baxter Building (headquarters of the Fantastic Four) is transported to the Negative Zone.
 Thunderbolt Mountain (headquarters of the Thunderbolts) is attacked.
Additionally, the Avengers are attacked by Skrulls posing as heroes in the Savage Land, and Reed Richards is wounded by the Skrull Criti Noll (who was posing as Henry Pym) seconds after determining a way to identify the shape shifters.

After several battles between Earth's heroes and the Skrulls in Manhattan and the Savage Land, Mr. Fantastic manages to develop a device that can detect the aliens. Criminal kingpin the Hood aids the heroes, deciding "no more Earth is bad for business." Veranke regroups with her forces in New York City in a final battle against the combined Avengers, now aided by Nick Fury and his new Commandos, Thor, Daredevil, Ka-Zar, and super teams such as the Young Avengers and the Thunderbolts.

Veranke is wounded by the Avenger Hawkeye. Criti Noll activates a booby trap placed on the heroine Wasp, although the blast is contained by Thor at the cost of her life. Veranke is then shot and killed by Norman Osborn (using a weapon he created with intelligence stolen from Deadpool). The last remnants of the Skrull armada are destroyed, with Iron Man locating the missing heroes. S.H.I.E.L.D. is dissolved by executive order of the President of the United States while a last Skrull (posing as the Avengers' butler Edwin Jarvis) flees with the child of hero Jessica Jones and Luke Cage. This Skrull is killed by Bullseye shortly after returning the child. Norman Osborn is placed in charge of S.H.I.E.L.D's replacement, H.A.M.M.E.R., and forms a secret group consisting of himself, Emma Frost, Namor, Doctor Doom, The Hood and Loki which commences the "Dark Reign" storyline.

Characters

The Mighty Avengers
 Iron Man
 Spider-Woman (Veranke)
 Black Widow
 Ares
 Ms. Marvel (Carol Danvers)
 Sentry
 Wonder Man
 Wasp

The New Avengers
 Luke Cage
 Spider-Man
 Iron Fist
 Ronin (Clint Barton)
 Wolverine
 Echo

Fantastic Four
 Mister Fantastic
 Human Torch
 Thing
 Invisible Woman

Skrulls
 Dard'van
 Yellowjacket (Citri Noll)
 Captain America
 Dum Dum Dugan
 Edwin Jarvis
 Captain Marvel (Mar-Vell)
 Invisible Woman
 Elektra
 White Queen (Skrull)
 Beast
 Spider-Man
 Luke Cage
 Thor
 Wonder Man
 Jean Grey
 Iron Man
 Hawkeye (Skrull)
 Vision
 Jewel (Skrull)
 Scarlet Witch
 Mockingbird
 Wolverine
 Ms. Marvel

Additionally, several variants of the Super-Skrull appear, utilizing the powers of Archangel, Captain America, Iron Man, Doctor Octopus, Electro, Sandman and the Illuminati, among others.

Also, several Skrulls are seen impersonating such pop culture figures as George W. Bush, Stephen Colbert, Tom Cruise, and Eric Cartman from South Park.

Cloak

Noh-Varr

Thunderbolts
 Norman Osborn
 Swordsman (Andreas von Strucker)
 Songbird
 Moonstone (Karla Sofen)
 Venom (Mac Gargan)
 Bullseye
 Robbie Baldwin (as Penance)

Captain America (Bucky Barnes)

Thor

Franklin Richards

Valeria Richards

Young Avengers
 Patriot
 Wiccan
 Hulkling
 Speed
 Hawkeye (Kate Bishop)
 Vision

The Initiative
 Diamondback (Rachel Leighton)
 Stature
 Gauntlet (Joseph Green)
 Prodigy (David Alleyne)
 Taskmaster
 Proton
 Crusader (Z'Reg)
 Batwing
 Gorilla Girl
 Red 9
 Geiger
 Melee
 Sunstreak
 Annex

Secret Warriors
 Nick Fury
 Slingshot
 Quake (Daisy Johnson)
 Phobos
 Hellfire (J.T. Slade)
 Stonewall
 Druid (Sebastian Druid)

Skrull Kill Krew
 Ryder
 3-D Man II
 Riot
 Catwalk
 Dice
 Moonstomp

The Hood's Criminal Syndicate
 Hood
 John King
 Wizard
 Wrecking Crew (Marvel Comics)
 Madame Masque
 Blood Brother
 Crossfire
 Blackout (Marcus Daniels)
 Griffin
 Chemistro
 Answer (Aaron Nicholson)
 Brothers Grimm
 Bushwhacker
 Shockwave
 Scarecrow
 Cutthroat
 Corruptor
 Masked Marauder
 Scorcher

Howard the Duck

X-Men
 Pixie
 Nightcrawler (Kurt Wagner)
 Cyclops
 Beast

Medusa

Black Panther

Sabra (Ruth Bat-Seraph)

Uatu the Watcher

Daredevil

Mockingbird

Valentina Allegra de Fontaine

President of the United States

Cabal

 Norman Osborn
 Hood
 Namor
 Lady Loki
 Doctor Doom
 Emma Frost

Reception

According to Comic Book Roundup, the core series has an average score of 6.9 out of 10, based on 79 critic reviews.

Issue #1 was not very well received despite critics noting its "strong introduction to the story, good pacing, and "slick" art style", although some concerns were raised over Bendis' dialogue. Sales estimates suggested that around 250,200 copies were sold, more than twice as much as the second highest seller. The Secret Invasion: The Infiltration collected volume also topped the trade paperback chart, with an estimated 7,247 sales. The second issue kept the top slot, with estimated sales dropping to 200,344.

Tie-in issues

Secret Invasion: The Infiltration
The following issues were released with The Infiltration banner prior to the launch of the Secret Invasion series:
 Avengers: The Initiative Annual #1
 Captain Marvel vol. 6, #4-5
 The Mighty Avengers #7
 Ms. Marvel vol. 2, #25-27
 The New Avengers #38-39
 The New Avengers: Illuminati #5
 Franklin Richards Not-So-Secret Invasion
 Marvel Spotlight Secret Invasion
 Secret Invasion Saga
 Secret Invasion Home Invasion

Secret Invasion
The following issues tie-in to the Secret Invasion mini-series:

 Avengers: The Initiative #14-19
 Black Panther vol. 4, #39-41
 Captain Britain and MI: 13 #1-4
 Deadpool (Vol. 4) #1-3
 Guardians of the Galaxy vol. 2, #4-6
 Incredible Hercules #116-120
 Iron Man: Director of S.H.I.E.L.D. #33-35
 Marvel Spotlight: Secret Invasion Saga #1
 The Mighty Avengers #12-20
 Ms. Marvel vol. 2, #28-30
 New Avengers #40-47
 New Warriors vol. 4, #14-15
 Nova vol. 4, #16-18
 Punisher War Journal #24-25

 Secret Invasion: The Amazing Spider-Man #1-3
 Secret Invasion: Aftermath Beta Ray Bill: The Green of Eden (One-Shot)
 Secret Invasion: Dark Reign (One-Shot)
 Secret Invasion: Fantastic Four #1-3
 Secret Invasion: Front Line #1-5
 Secret Invasion: Inhumans #1-4
 Secret Invasion: Requiem #1
 Secret Invasion: Runaways/Young Avengers #1-3
 Secret Invasion: Thor #1-3
 Secret Invasion: War Of Kings (One-Shot)
 Secret Invasion: Who Do You Trust? (one-shot)
 Secret Invasion: X-Men #1-4
 She-Hulk vol. 2, #31-33
 Skrulls! (one-shot)
 Thunderbolts #122-125
 X-Factor vol. 3, #33-34

Collected editions
The stories are collected in volumes:

Sequels
From November 2022 forward, Marvel released a new Secret Invasion title composed of five issue miniseries that serves as a spiritual sequel to the original event and sees new hints from the Skrulls to invade again Earth that will force Maria Hill to put out an alert in the intelligence community to prove that they are ready for another Skrull invasion. After dealing with the various Nick Fury imposters, she alerts the Avengers and assures them that it is unlikely that they have been infiltrated, unfortunately she is wrong. While the world's most clandestine forces move in silence to quell the situation before it gets out of hand, Earth's Mightiest Heroes have been left wondering who among them might be an alien infiltrator. Thankfully, Maria Hill is quick to move on to the ranks of Earth's Mightiest Heroes for immediate blood testing. Though her methods are certainly intrusive, to say the least, the Avengers all acquiesce to her demands for a blood sample. This leads to Black Widow being uncovered as a Skrull, which when coupled with the lack of any other failed tests, is enough to calm the rest of the heroes' nerves for the time being. And, in the case of Tony Stark, it is enough to assure him that his fellow Skrulls' plans are going exactly as intended. Upon returning to his lab, Stark is met by another version of himself while revealing the blood bag taped to his arm which he used to pass Hill's test. This is more than enough to make it perfectly clear that Stark has been replaced without anyone else realizing it. It also sets the stage for the latest Skrull invasion to do untold amounts of damage before anyone can stop him, assuming no one figures out the truth anytime soon.

Other versions

Earth-3290
In this reality, Earth surrendered to the Skrulls.

What If?
An issue of What If revolves around the Secret Invasion with two stories.
The first story asks what would happen if the Skrulls won the Secret Invasion and solved mankind's challenges such as freedom. Here, the Skrulls are celebrating their anniversary of taking over Earth. Some humans have been converted into Skrulls. The Avengers Alliance of Freedom (led by Captain America II and consisting of Black Panther, Blue Marvel, Human Torch, a heavily alcoholic Iron Man, Khn'nr, Ms. Marvel, Night Thrasher II, Spider-Man, Spider-Woman II, Storm, Thing, Thor, and Wolverine) are considered terrorists to the rest of the world. The Skrull's broadcast is interrupted by a pirate footage of Captain America stating that Earth is really under occupation. Queen Veranke's consort Norman Osborn tells her that it would be best to crush the Avengers Alliance of Freedom in Wakanda where they are currently hiding. Wolverine has brought one last remaining sample of the modified Legacy Virus to use against the Skrulls. Veranke appears before the United Nations and gets approval to invade Wakanda and take down the Avengers Alliance of Freedom. As soon as the virus is ready, the Skrull forces attack Wakanda. The Avengers leap into action to repel them. When the cannon meant to release the vaccine is destroyed, Thor uses his powers to spread it across the globe. But instead of doing what was expected, every Skrull and converted humans perishes. The culprit is in fact Norman Osborn. He explains that this was all an elaborate ruse to get what he wants. Due to Iron Man's alcoholism, Spider-Man helped him infiltrate Wakanda to help them but he did not expect that Norman Osborn would cross the line. Osborn admits that he did create a cure for the virus, so that he could survive and get back at the Skrulls for using him. Enraged, Captain America beheads Osborn with his shield. The Avengers surrender to the UN forces sent to arrest them. Meanwhile, far up on the Moon, Uatu the Watcher can only lament how this alternate Earth turned out.

The second story asks what would happen if the Secret Invasion remained secret. Norman Osborn is shown wondering what would happen if he was in charge of national security. Already on this Earth, Captain America has been pardoned for his role in the Civil War and is seen shaking hands with the Red Skull. Hours later, Norman Osborn and the Thunderbolts are dispatched to investigate a situation in the Savage Land. They infiltrate a mysterious structure full of duplicates of superhumans. The Thunderbolts attempt to fight through, only for them all to be massacred and Osborn captured. He is brought before Veranke/Spider-Woman. She tells him a little story about how a priest stood up to her and told her that she would die by the hands of Norman Osborn himself. Therefore, the Skrulls had to integrate themselves into human society and eventually fade away. She claims that the prophet became Osborn himself. Though Norman Osborn tries to deny it, Veranke insists that he is and asks that he kiss her true face. Instead, Norman Osborn commits suicide, and reverts him to his Skrull form.

In other media

Television
 The plot of the Secret Invasion storyline was adapted in the animated series The Avengers: Earth's Mightiest Heroes. A newspaper seen at the beginning of the episode "Masters of Evil" includes a headline for a Baxter Building tenant's recollections of becoming replaced by an alien. Also, in the episode "The Kang Dynasty", Kang the Conqueror references both Civil War and Secret Invasion by saying: "Captain America's betrayal is just the beginning... The worst is yet to come." Later, towards the end of episode "Widow's Sting", the captured Madame Hydra is revealed to be a Skrull in disguise. At the end of the episode "A Day Unlike Any Other", after the Avengers return from their battle with Loki, Captain America is attacked and replaced by a Skrull who goes on to say "The infiltration has begun" as the Skrull takes Captain America's place. In the season two premiere episode, "The Private War of Doctor Doom", Invisible Woman of the Fantastic Four was also revealed to be a Skrull. However, as of "Welcome to the Kree Empire", only Doctor Doom and Nick Fury seem aware of the infiltration. In "Who Do You Trust?", it is shown that Veranke is posing as Mockingbird (mirroring Veranke impersonating Spider-Woman in the original comic). In the episode "Infiltration", the Skrull Invasion begins and Ms. Marvel is tricked by Skrull Avengers to help attack Wakanda and the Black Panther but the Skrull Avengers are later defeated when Hawkeye and the Wasp show up. Veranke also installs a virus in Iron Man's armor. In the episode "Secret Invasion", Nick Fury and Maria Hill save Iron Man, Captain America returns to Earth (along with the real heroes and villains who had been revealed to be replaced before), and the Avengers defeat the Super-Skrulls and Thor destroys their backup plan to wipe out humanity. The invasion is thwarted and the Skrulls are put in S.H.I.E.L.D. custody.
 In December 2020, a Disney+ Secret Invasion television show based on the limited comic series was announced as part of the Marvel Cinematic Universe (MCU). It will star Samuel L. Jackson as Nick Fury and Ben Mendelsohn as Talos, both reprising their roles from the MCU films and Kingsley Ben-Adir as the series villain while Olivia Colman, Emilia Clarke, Killian Scott, Christopher McDonald and Carmen Ejogo were cast in undisclosed roles.

Video games
 Ubisoft and Marvel Entertainment stated Marvel Avengers: Battle for Earth was influenced by the Secret Invasion.
 Secret Invasion is used as the basis for Chapter 10 in the plot of the game Marvel Heroes''.

Merchandising
 Marvel HeroClix released a "Secret Invasion"-themed set based on the storyline. The set included Captain Marvel, Dum-Dum Dugan, Yellowjacket, Elektra, Ms. Marvel, Jarvis, and many more. Veranke (as Spider-Woman) and Lyja (as the Invisible Woman) were released as chase figures in their Skrull-only personality.

References

External links
 Marvel.com - Secret Invasion: Skrull Revelations
 
 
 Secret Invasion: First Strike, Newsarama
 WizardUniverse.com - Secret Invasion #1 Director’s Commentary
 GammaPoweredRadio.com - The entire Marvel: Secret Invasion Panel from the NYC Comic-Con 2008

Alien invasions in comics
Comics by Brian Michael Bendis
Comics set in New York City
Green Goblin
War comics
Comics adapted into television series